Cerezo Haabo (born 3 March 1994) is a Surinamese professional footballer who plays as a forward for SVB Eerste Divisie club Broki.

International career 
Haabo made his debut for Suriname in a 0–0 draw against Dominica on 6 September 2018.

Honours 
Robinhood
 SVB Eerste Divisie: 2017–18
 SVB Cup: 2015–16, 2017–18
 Suriname President's Cup: 2016

Inter Moengotapoe
 SVB Eerste Divisie: 2018–19
 SVB Cup: 2018–19

References

External links 
 
 

1994 births
Living people
Surinamese footballers
People from Sipaliwini District
Association football forwards
S.V. Robinhood players
Inter Moengotapoe players
S.V. Broki players
SVB Eerste Divisie players
Suriname international footballers